Riley-Jay Harbottle (born 26 September 2000) is an English professional footballer who plays as a defender for Mansfield Town on loan from Nottingham Forest.

Career

Nottingham Forest
Harbottle joined the Nottingham Forest academy at the foundation stage, staying with the team before signing his first professional contract in October 2017. He made his first team debut for Forest on 11 August 2021, starting against Bradford City in the EFL Cup. On 20 June 2022, Harbottle signed a two-year extension to his deal with Forest, keeping him at the City Ground until the summer of 2024.

Loan to Wealdstone
On 19 March 2021, Harbottle joined National League side Wealdstone on an initial one-month loan. He remained with the club for the rest of the season, making 11 appearances.

Loan to Mansfield Town
On 16 July 2022, Harbottle moved on a season-long loan to EFL League Two side Mansfield Town.

References

2000 births
Living people
Association football defenders
English footballers
Footballers from Nottingham
Mansfield Town F.C. players
National League (English football) players
Nottingham Forest F.C. players
Wealdstone F.C. players